Dolus-d'Oléron (literally Dolus of Oléron) is a commune on the Isle of Oléron in the Charente-Maritime department, southwestern France. The area is mostly residential, with a village-style main street with a church and small complex of amenities including a large supermarket, petrol station, DIY shop and some other retail. At the coast is Vert Bois woods and Vert Bois beach.

Population

See also
 Communes of the Charente-Maritime department

References

External links
 

Communes of Charente-Maritime
Oléron
Populated coastal places in France